Joaquín García Cenarro (1875 – Unknown) was a Spanish footballer who played as a forward for FC Barcelona and Club Español (now known as RCD Espanyol). Although little has been recorded of his life, he was one of the most prominent footballers in the Copa Macaya, the first football championship played on the Iberian Peninsula, winning the competition with both Barça (1901–02) and Espanyol (1902–03).

Biography
García was introduced to football during his time as a student in England. He began to practice football in Plymouth during this period. At the age of 26, García returned to Spain and settled in Barcelona, where he decided to continue his love of football and joined the city's main club, FC Barcelona, in 1901. Together with captain Joan Gamper, Luis de Ossó, Udo Steinberg and Gustavo Green, he played a pivotal role in helping Barça win the 1901–02 Copa Macaya, which was the club's first-ever piece of silverware, netting 5 goals including back-to-back braces against Club University and his future club RCD Espanyol. The following season, he was recruited by Club Español where he spent two seasons. In his first season at the club, together with René Fenouillière, Ángel Ponz, and Gustavo Green, García managed to win the third and last Copa Macaya, which means that he won two back-to-back championships in a row with different teams.

Together with Joaquim Escardó, Ángel Rodríguez, and Gustavo Green, he was part of the team that won the first edition of the Campionat de Catalunya in 1903–04.

International career
He played his last career match for the Catalan national team on 29 May 1904 in a game against his former club, Club Espanyol, scoring once in a 4–1 win.

Honours
FC Barcelona
Copa Macaya:
Winners (1) 1901–02

RCD Espanyol
Copa Macaya:
Winners (1) 1902–03

Catalan Championships:
Winners (1) 1903–04

References

1875 births
Year of death missing
Footballers from Barcelona
Spanish footballers
Association football forwards
FC Barcelona players
RCD Espanyol footballers